Yukarıçamlı is a village in the Bolu District, Bolu Province, Turkey. Its population is 173 (2021). It is 18 km from the centre of Bolu.

References

Villages in Bolu District